The 2004 Masters Tournament was the 68th Masters Tournament, held April 8–11 at Augusta National Golf Club in Augusta, Georgia. Phil Mickelson, 33, won his first major championship with a birdie on the final hole to win by one stroke over runner-up Ernie Els. The purse was $6.0 million and the winner's share was $1.17 million.

This was the 50th consecutive and final Masters appearance for four-time champion Arnold Palmer.

Playoff alteration
Prior to this Masters, the sudden-death playoff was changed to begin on the 18th hole and alternate with the 10th hole. This new starting point was first used the following year in 2005. When the playoff format was changed to sudden-death for 1976, it began at the 10th hole, then went to the 11th, and was first used in 1979. Prior to 1976, playoffs at Augusta were full 18-hole rounds on Monday, and the last was won by Billy Casper in 1970. The exception was the first playoff in 1935, which was 36 holes.

Course

Field
1. Masters champions
Tommy Aaron, Charles Coody, Fred Couples (14,16,17), Ben Crenshaw, Nick Faldo, Raymond Floyd, Bernhard Langer, Sandy Lyle, Larry Mize, Jack Nicklaus, José María Olazábal (10), Mark O'Meara (10), Arnold Palmer, Gary Player, Vijay Singh (10,12,14,15,16,17), Craig Stadler, Tom Watson, Mike Weir (10,11,14,15,16,17), Tiger Woods (2,3,4,10,12,14,15,16,17), Ian Woosnam, Fuzzy Zoeller

George Archer, Seve Ballesteros, Gay Brewer, Jack Burke Jr., Billy Casper, Doug Ford, Bob Goalby, and Byron Nelson did not play.

2. U.S. Open champions (last five years)
Retief Goosen (10,14,16,17)
Jim Furyk (10,11,14,16,17) did not play.

3. The Open champions (last five years)
Ben Curtis (12,16,17), Ernie Els (10,11,14,16,17), Paul Lawrie (10)
David Duval did not play.

4. PGA champions (last five years)
Rich Beem (10,16), Shaun Micheel (13,14,16,17), David Toms (10,11,14,16,17)

5. The Players Championship winners (last three years)
Davis Love III (10,12,14,15,16,17), Craig Perks, Adam Scott (15,16,17)

6. U.S. Amateur champion and runner-up
Nick Flanagan (a), Casey Wittenberg (a)

7. The Amateur champion
Gary Wolstenholme (a)

8. U.S. Amateur Public Links champion
Brandt Snedeker (a)

9. U.S. Mid-Amateur champion
Nathan Smith (a)

10. Top 16 players and ties from the 2003 Masters
Jonathan Byrd, Ángel Cabrera, K. J. Choi (14,16,17), Tim Clark (12), Jeff Maggert, Len Mattiace, Phil Mickelson (14,16,17), Scott Verplank (14,16,17)

11. Top eight players and ties from the 2003 U.S. Open
Freddie Jacobson (16,17), Stephen Leaney (16,17), Kenny Perry (14,16,17), Nick Price (14,16,17), Justin Rose

12. Top four players and ties from the 2003 Open Championship
Thomas Bjørn (16,17)

13. Top four players and ties from 2003 PGA Championship
Chad Campbell (14,15,16,17), Alex Čejka (16,17)

14. Top 40 players from the 2003 PGA Tour money list
Robert Allenby (16,17), Stuart Appleby (15,16,17), Briny Baird, Stewart Cink (17), Chris DiMarco (16,17), Bob Estes (16), Brad Faxon (16,17), Steve Flesch (17), Fred Funk (16,17), Jay Haas (16,17), Tim Herron (16), Charles Howell III (16,17), Jonathan Kaye (15,16,17), Jerry Kelly (16,17), Justin Leonard (16,17), J. L. Lewis, Shigeki Maruyama (16,17), Rocco Mediate (16,17), Tim Petrovic, Chris Riley (16,17), John Rollins, Jeff Sluman, Kirk Triplett (17), Bob Tway (16,17)

15. Top 10 players from the 2004 PGA Tour money list on March 28
John Daly

16. Top 50 players from the final 2003 world ranking
Michael Campbell, Paul Casey (17), Darren Clarke (17), Sergio García (17), Pádraig Harrington (17), Toshimitsu Izawa, Peter Lonard (17), Colin Montgomerie (17), Ian Poulter (17), Phillip Price, Eduardo Romero

17. Top 50 players from world ranking published March 28
Brian Davis, Todd Hamilton, Trevor Immelman, Craig Parry

18. Special foreign invitation
Zhang Lianwei

Round-by-round results

First round
Thursday, April 8, 2004
Friday, April 9, 2004

23-year-old Englishman Justin Rose posted a five-under 67 to lead after the first round. Americans Chris DiMarco and Jay Haas shot 69 (−3) and two-time U.S. Open champion Ernie Els was among a group tied for fourth with 70 (−2). Among the seven players tied at 71 (−1) was two-time Masters champion, José María Olazábal. Phil Mickelson shot an even-par 72, and three-time Masters champion Tiger Woods shot a 75 (+3). The winner of the previous major (2003 PGA Championship), Shaun Micheel, was at even-par 72. Play was suspended for roughly two hours due to rain, so 18 players completed their opening round on Friday morning.

Second round
Friday, April 9, 2004

First round leader Rose put together another good round (71) to take the 36-hole lead at 138 (−6). Olazábal shot a 69 to close within two strokes of the lead in a tie for second with Alex Čejka, who shot 70. Mickelson, trying to remove the best player never to win a major championship label, moved into a share of fourth with a 69, alongside K. J. Choi. Davis Love III was one of two to shoot the round of the day with a 67 (−5), which moved him into a tie for sixth with Els, DiMarco, Charles Howell III, and 1992 champion Fred Couples. Most notables made the cut at 148 (+4), but among those failing to advance were defending champion Mike Weir and Ben Curtis, the 2003 Open Champion.

Amateurs: Snedeker (+4), Wittenberg (+4), Smith (+6), Flanagan (+8), Wolstenholme (+9).

Third round
Saturday, April 10, 2004

Mickelson moved from fourth to a share of the 54-hole lead with a three-under 69, while the top three golfers after round two collapsed. Rose shot an 81, Olazábal a 79, and Čejka a 78. This collective meltdown by the top three allowed Mickelson and DiMarco to rise to the top. DiMarco finished tied for the 54-hole lead with a four-under 68. Paul Casey put together a 68 as well to move within two strokes of the co-leaders at the end of the day. Els continued his steady play with a one-under 71 to move into a three-way tie for fourth. Kirk Triplett and Freddie Jacobson put themselves in contention at seventh and eighth, respectively.

Final round
Sunday, April 11, 2004

Summary
In one of the most exciting back nines in Masters history, Mickelson dueled Els to claim his first major championship. Mickelson shot a final round 69, sealed with an  birdie on the 18th green to win by a stroke. Playing two groups ahead of Mickelson, Els started the day at −3 and posted a 67 (−5). As Mickelson approached the final hole, Els' total of 280 (−8) appeared enough to at least get him into a playoff. Els stumbled out of the gate with two bogeys in his first five holes, but quickly regained his form. He collected two eagles on his round, at the par-5 8th and 13th holes. Els also connected on a birdie at the 15th to get him to −8. Seeing his first major possibly slip away with a 38 (+2) on his front nine, Mickelson had to match Els' fire on the back nine, and shot a bogey-free 31, with birdies on five of the final seven holes. Mickelson birdied the par-3 12th and par-5 13th. He briefly tied Els with his third consecutive birdie at the par-4 14th, then had a disappointing par on the par-5 15th. He remained tied heading to the final tee, and when his approach shot landed on the green, a winning putt was before him. As Mickelson sunk the putt, he jumped for joy as he won his first major title.

K. J. Choi finished third, which was his best major finish, with a final round 69 to total 282 (−6). Sergio García shot the round of the tournament with a 66 (−6) to tie for fourth with two-time Masters champion Bernhard Langer. Four major champions, including two former Masters champions (Vijay Singh,  Couples, Love, and Nick Price) were in the group who finished tied for sixth at 286 (−2). Woods' streak of not winning a major extended to seven with a disappointing 290 (+2), the same score tallied by first and second round leader Rose.

Final leaderboard

Scorecard

Cumulative tournament scores, relative to par
{|class="wikitable" span = 50 style="font-size:85%;
|-
|style="background: Red;" width=10|
|Eagle
|style="background: Pink;" width=10|
|Birdie
|style="background: PaleGreen;" width=10|
|Bogey
|style="background: Green;" width=10|
|Double bogey
|}
Source:

Quotes
"Is it his time? YES! At long last!" – Jim Nantz's (CBS Sports) call as Mickelson sunk his birdie putt on the 18th hole to defeat Ernie Els and win the tournament.

References

External links
Masters.com – past winners
Coverage on the European Tour's official site
Full results
Augusta.com – 2004 Masters leaderboard and scorecards

2004
2004 in golf
2004 in American sports
2004 in sports in Georgia (U.S. state)
April 2004 sports events in the United States